Ó Cobhthaigh is a Gaelic-Irish surname. It is now generally Anglicised Cofer, Coffer, Copher, Coffey, Caughey, Coffee, Coffie, Coughey, Cauffey, Cauffy, Cauffie, Coffy, Coughay, Coffay, Coffeye and many more.

Overview

Ó Cobhthaigh was the name of an Irish Brehon family from what is now County Westmeath and County Longford. They were known as the chief ollamhs or filí of Uisneach, where there is a Tuar Uí Cobhthaigh, Toorcoffey (Coffey's Tower). The Annals of the Four Masters record the deaths of members of the family in 1415 and 1452. In 1546 Tadhg Ó Cobhthaigh, called ‘chief preceptor of Ireland and Scotland in poetry’, was arrested by the Dublin administration ‘for his attachment to the Irish’, ‘and confined for eighteen weeks in the King's castle’. It was ‘intended that he should be put to death’, but he managed to escape. He died in 1554. Another member of the family, Uaithne, son of Uilliam Ó Cobhthaigh, ‘the most learned in Ireland in poetry’, ‘was treacherously slain at night [along with his wife] . . . but it is not known by whom’. 

The poem beginning "" (Two clouds of woe over Uisneach's land), which is 150 verses long, deals with the murder of the poet Uaithne Ó Cobhthaigh and his wife in 1556

There were at least three other families of the name, located in the regions of Limerick-Kerry, Down, west Cork, and Galway.

Genealogy

Dubhaltach Mac Fhirbhisigh preserved an Ó Cobhthaigh genealogy in Leabhar na nGenealach:

 Genealach Uí Chobthaigh: Tadhg m. Cobthaig m. Balldair m. Niocoil m. Conchabhair m. Maghnusa m. Aeda m. Donnchuidh an Daingin m. Fearguil in Dúin m. Diarmada m. Conchabhair m. Mathghamna m. Conchabhair Cearmna m. Mec-Raith m. Domnuill m. Don[n]chuidh Moir m. Cobhthaigh finn, o ttaid Ui Chobthaigh (from whom are Uí Chobthaigh) m. Dunghalaigh m. Mec-Con m. Connadh Chilline m. Feargusa mc. Ailealla, p670;

A genealogy on pp. 660–61 picks up from Fearghus mac Oilill: Fearghusa m. Ailealla m. Mec-Rithe m. Conaill Claoín m. Gearain m. Duach tracing the family back to Íoth mac Breogán.

See also

 An Clasach Ó Cobhthaigh, poet, died 1415.
 Maeleachlainn Ó Cobhthaigh, poet, died 1429.
 Domhnall Ó Cobhthaigh, poet, died 1446.
 Aedh Ó Cobhthaigh, poet, died 1452.
 Tomás Ó Cobhthaigh, poet, died 1474.
 Murchadh Bacagh Ó Cobhthaigh, poet, died 1478.
 Tadhg Ó Cobhthaigh, poet, fl. 1554.
 Uaithne Ó Cobhthaigh, poet, died 1556.
 Diarmait Ó Cobhthaigh, poet, fl. 1584. 
 Donnchadh Ó Cobhthaigh, poet, fl. 1584.
 Muircheartach Ó Cobhthaigh, poet, fl. 1586.
 Charles Coffey, playwright and composer, died 1745.
 Brian Coffey, poet and publisher, 1905–1995.
 Ciarán Ó Cofaigh, director and producer.
 Bláthnaid Ní Chofaigh, TV personality.

External links
 http://www.irishtimes.com/ancestor/surname/index.cfm?fuseaction=Go.&UserID=
 Search Oxford National Biography

References

 Ó Cobhthaigh family, pp. 435–436, in Oxford Dictionary of National Biography, volume 41, Norbury-Osbourne, September 2004.
 Genealach Uí Chobthaigh/Genealogy of Ó Cobhthaigh, pp. 670–71, Leabhar na nGenealach. The Great Book of Irish Genealogies, Dubhaltach Mac Fhirbhisigh (eag./ed. Nollaig Ó Muraíle, De Burca, Dublin, 2004–05.

Surnames
Irish families
Irish Brehon families
Surnames of Irish origin
Irish-language surnames
Families of Irish ancestry